Limelight Records was a jazz record label and subsidiary of Mercury Records started in 1962. The catalogue included music by Art Blakey, Dizzy Gillespie, Earl Hines, Milt Jackson, Gerry Mulligan, and Oscar Peterson.

Originally headed by Quincy Jones, its activities were directed by the producer Jack Tracy. Though mainly a jazz label, it also released rock, experimental, electronic, and Indian music.

The label's masters are now controlled by Verve Records and The Island Def Jam Music Group, which has reissued some of the Limelight releases on CD.

Discography

Albums

References

External links
Discogs

Jazz record labels
American record labels